The Brazil national tennis team represents Brazil in Davis Cup tennis competition and are governed by the Brazilian Tennis Confederation.

After nine years, Brazil returned to the World Group in 2013 with a defeat by the United States in the first round. Brazil also played in 2015, losing to Argentina.

Current team (2022)

 Thiago Monteiro (ATP singles ranking no. 65)
 Felipe Meligeni Alves (ATP doubles ranking no. 100)
 Matheus Pucinelli de Almeida (ATP singles ranking no. 224)
 Thiago Seyboth Wild (ATP singles ranking no. 370)
 Rafael Matos (ATP doubles ranking no. 36)

History
Brazil competed in its first Davis Cup in 1932.

Results

Best results

Recent Results

Former squad members
Active single players listed in bold and active double players listed also in italic; active player rankings (in parentheses) as of February 22, 2016

See also
Davis Cup
Brazil Fed Cup team

External links

Davis Cup teams
Davis Cup
Tennis